is a former Japanese football player.

Club statistics

References

External links

1985 births
Living people
Fukuoka University alumni
Association football people from Hiroshima Prefecture
Japanese footballers
J2 League players
Avispa Fukuoka players
Association football defenders